Aporrhais pespelecani, common name the "pelican's foot" (or more precisely "common pelican's foot" to distinguish it from congeners), is a species of sea snail, a marine gastropod mollusk in the family Aporrhaidae.

Until the early 20th century the scientific name was usually written with a hyphen and spelled "pes-pelicani".

Etymology and nomenclature
The specific name pespelecani is Latin, and means the same thing as the common name: "pelican's foot". This name is based on the shape of the three-pointed (or four-pointed) expanded outer lip of the adult shell, which resembles the webbed foot of a sea bird such as a pelican.

The specific name is often spelled pespelicani by analogy with the modern spelling of the word "pelican", however this is incorrect. It was not the original spelling as used by Linnaeus, the original authority of the species, which he called Strombus Pes pelecani. The rules of the ICZN state that the original spelling of a species name is the correct one, even in cases where the word was originally misspelled, or is not in line with current spelling. However, in this case, the specific name must now be written as one word, not two, and cannot be hyphenated.

Distribution
This snail lives in the Eastern Atlantic Ocean, from Norway to the Mediterranean Sea  and also in the Black Sea.

Habitat
This species of sea snail lives below the low tide level, in the sublittoral zone, from 10 to 130 m depth, on mud or muddy sand. The empty shells do sometimes wash up on beaches however.

References

 MarLIN info for the British Isles at: 
 Info for the Black Sea at:

External links
 Image of two live individuals on mud 

Aporrhaidae
Gastropods described in 1758
Taxa named by Carl Linnaeus